Kak may refer to:

People
Kak (clan), an Indian Hindu lineage, a Kashmiri Pandit surname
Ram Chandra Kak (1893-1983), Indian politician, chief minister of Jammu and Kashmir
Amar Nath Kak
Siddharth Kak
Subhash Kak

Other
Kak (commune), Bar Kaev, Cambodia
Kak (band)
 Kak, a South African slang word
 Royal Automobile Club (Sweden)
Kak (lake), a lake in Kazakhstan

See also
 Kaak (disambiguation)

ru:Как